Bahia (a former spelling of the Portuguese word for "bay") is a state in Brazil.

Bahia may also refer to:

Places
 Salvador, Bahia, the capital city of the state of Bahia
 Captaincy of Bahia, the colonial Brazilian administration of the area of present-day Bahia
 Bahia Province, the imperial Brazilian administration of the area of present-day Bahia
 Bahía Blanca, a city in Argentina
 Bahía de Caráquez, a city in Ecuador
 Bahia Honda Key, an island in the Florida Keys
 Bahía Honda, Cuba, a town in Cuba
 Bahía de Cata, a beach of Aragua state, Venezuela
 Bahia Palace, placa in Morocco

Other uses
 Bahia (album), 1958 album by John Coltrane
 Bahia (plant), small genus of perennial flowering plants in the family Asteraceae
 Bahia 22, French sailboat design
 Bahía culture, pre-Columbian culture in present-day Ecuador
 Bahia Emerald, one of the largest emeralds ever found
 Bahia grass (P. notatum), tropical to subtropical perennial grass
 Brazilian ship Bahia, several ships of the Brazilian Navy
 Esporte Clube Bahia, Brazilian football club
 Axé Bahia, Brazilian music group
 "Bahia", song by Ary Barroso commonly known as "Na Baixa do Sapateiro"

People
 Bahia (name), list of people with the name

See also
Bahiyyih, a given name
Bahai (disambiguation)
Baha (disambiguation)